Drtina (with its female form Drtinová) is a rather rare Czech surname which is most prevalent in the Czech capital Prague followed by the Tábor District within the South Bohemian Region to its south and is also present in the Czech diaspora. The Czech word drtina translates into English as crumb (soft internal portion of bread) and so the Czech surname roughly corresponds to the English surname Crumb.

Notable people with the name Drtina/Drtinová include:
 (1900–1980), Czech lawyer, minister of justice in 1945-1948
 (1861–1925), Czech academic and politician 
 (born 1970), Czech TV presenter, journalist and lawyer
Jiří Drtina (born 1985), Czech professional ice hockey defenceman
Marek Drtina (born 1989), Czech professional ice hockey defenceman

References

Czech-language surnames